Tavík František Šimon (13 May 1877 in Železnice, Bohemia (now the Czech Republic) – 19 December 1942 in Prague), was a Czech painter, etcher, and woodcut artist. Born František Šimon, he later adopted the additional name 'Tavík', which was his mother's maiden name, generally signing his work T. F. Šimon. Largely ignored during the Communist era in Czechoslovakia, his work has received greater attention in recent years.

Life and career
Šimon was born in Železnice (known at that time as Eisenstadtl) near Jičín. As a student at the Academy of Fine Arts, Prague, he received a stipend that allowed him to travel to Italy, Belgium, England and France. He had his first solo exhibition in Prague in 1905, and a Paris exhibition in 1906. His extensive travels would eventually also bring him to New York City, London, the Netherlands, Spain, Morocco, Ceylon (now Sri Lanka), India, and Japan, images of all of which appear in his work.

After spending 1904–1914 based in Paris, Šimon returned to Prague and became a professor at the Academy of Fine Arts in 1928. In 1917, he became a founding member of the Hollar Association of Czech Graphic Artists, which he later chaired.

Many of his most notable images are of  Prague, Amsterdam, New York, and Paris, but also include portraiture and self-portraiture and images of the Czech and Slovak countryside. Šimon's style was strongly influenced by the French Impressionists and, perhaps through them, by Japanese printmaking techniques, in particular color aquatints with soft ground etching. Šimon was also a master of the mezzotint but completed very few prints in this difficult medium, most of them being female nudes in subtle tones of black.

Voyage Around the World 1926–1927
Šimon was 49 years old when he undertook the journey of his lifetime, sailing literally around the world departing Cherbourg in September 1926 and travelling through the USA, crossing the newly built Panama Canal to sail the Pacific to the Far East and then back home to Europe via Ceylon and the middle East.

On his return, he compiled his correspondence and released the book Listy z cesty kolem světa (Letters from Around the World), published by J. Otto, Prague in 1928.

His notes and letters home reveal a world that was unknown by those in Old Europe – a challenging new mechanistic society in America, a transforming Empire in the Far East, and an untouched paradise in the island of Ceylon.  His glimpses into the past provide us with a view of history, through the eyes of a painter, that takes us back to a time when neon lights were marvels, when geisha were icons, before commercial air travel and when the only way to share your adventure with loved ones and family was through sending letters home.

Arriving in New York, he wrote, "The ship’s orchestra was playing as we slowly approached the port of New York City in the morning. In the distance we could see the outlines of skyscrapers drowning in a silver haze then, as we came closer, rising and standing, etched against the shimmering background of the rising sun.  A shiver went up and down my spine as we entered the huge harbour whose backdrop of slim buildings was interspersed with the rising smoke from factories".

In 2014 his book was translated and published for the first time in English as 'Letters from a Voyage Around the World' with an introduction by the artist's grandson Michal Šimon.

Gallery

References

 Scot A. Campbell, The Graphic Work of T.F. Šimon, Frederick Baker Inc, Chicago (2002)
 T.F.Šimon, 'Příručka umělce - Grafika', Jan Stenc, 1921 ('Artists handbook - Graphics')
 T.F.Šimon, 'Listy z cesty kolem světa', J.Otto, 1928 ('Journal from my travels around the world')
 T.F.Šimon, introduction by Michal Šimon, 'Letters from a Voyage Around the World', D.Pearson, Australia. 2014 
 Catharine Bentinck, 'In the Footsteps of Tavík František Šimon' Kontexty, Czech Republic. 2014.
 Catharine Bentinck, 'T.F.Šimon - Catalogue Raisonné and Biographical Sketch. Private Publication. 2015.
 Catharine Bentinck, 'Tavík František Šimon in Ceylon'. Drawings, prints and paintings of Šimon's stay in Ceylon. Private Publication. 2017.

External links

TFSimon.com, website dedicated to the artist's life and work, with extensive reproductions of Šimon's works and those of other Czech artists. (2002-2021).

1877 births
1942 deaths
Czech printmakers
People from Jičín District
20th-century Czech painters
Czech male painters
20th-century Czech printmakers
Color engravers
20th-century Czech male artists
20th-century engravers
Painters from the Austro-Hungarian Empire